Aleksandar Popović (born 2 November 1983) is a retired Austrian-Serbian football midfielder who plays for FK Beograd.

Career
He was born in Klagenfurt, Austria. He started his career playing with BSV Bad Bleiberg. In 2001, he moved to FR Yugoslavia and joined Serbian giants red Star Belgrade, however he spent most time on loan at FK Jedinstvo Ub. Afterwards, he returned to Austria and then played one season, already as senior, at his previous club, BSV Bad Bleiberg.

In 2003, he moved abroad again, this time just crossing the border and joining Slovenian top-league side Olimpija Ljubljana, playing with them the seasons 2003–04 and 2004–05.

His fine performances in SLovenian PrvaLiga made interest in the region grow, and he returned to Serbia and signed with FK Vojvodina. Popović became the team captain in Serbian SuperLiga club FK Vojvodina, and in summer 2009, he moved to Super League Greece to play in Kavala F.C. in the Greek Super League. In 2010, he returned again to Serbia and played with FK Beograd in third-tier, the Serbian League Belgrade.

Notes

1983 births
Living people
Sportspeople from Klagenfurt
Footballers from Carinthia (state)
Serbian footballers
Serbian expatriate footballers
Austrian footballers
NK Olimpija Ljubljana (1945–2005) players
Expatriate footballers in Slovenia
Red Star Belgrade footballers
FK Jedinstvo Ub players
FK Vojvodina players
Serbian SuperLiga players
Kavala F.C. players
Super League Greece players
Serbian expatriate sportspeople in Greece
Expatriate footballers in Greece
Association football midfielders